The Gravelly Hill Interchange, popularly known as Spaghetti Junction, is a road junction in Birmingham, England. It is junction 6 of the M6 motorway where it meets the A38(M) Aston Expressway in the Gravelly Hill area of Birmingham. The interchange was opened on 24 May 1972.

Background 
The asymmetrical junction provides access to and from the A38 (Tyburn Road), A38(M) (Aston Expressway), the A5127 (Lichfield Road/Gravelly Hill), and several unclassified local roads. The engineers had to elevate  of motorway to accommodate two railway lines, three canals and two rivers.

In 1958, the Ministry of Transport commissioned the engineering firm Sir Owen Williams & Partners to investigate possible routes to connect the M6, the A38(M) and the A38 trunk road.

The interchange's colloquial name, "Spaghetti Junction", was coined in 1965 by journalists from the Birmingham Evening Mail. On 1 June 1965, reporter Roy Smith described plans for the then unbuilt junction as a "cross between a plate of spaghetti and an unsuccessful attempt at a Staffordshire knot" and sub-editor Alan Eaglesfield headlined the article "Spaghetti Junction". The name would later be given to other complex road junctions around the world. The student magazine of Birmingham City University, Spaghetti Junction, took its name from the interchange's nickname, before being rebranded as Polygon.

Construction 
The development of the interchange was approved and announced in August 1968 by the then Minister of Transport, Richard Marsh. Construction was expected to take three years and to cost £8m. The work was led by chief engineer Roy Foot. There were a number of objections and protests over the interchange, particularly a campaign to "save our fish" to relocate a quarter of a million fish from a pool that would be removed as part of the engineering work. One stipulation in construction was that the canal towpaths running underneath the junction need to have sufficient clearance to allow horses. Work was mostly complete by May 1970, and attracted attention of local residents. By the following September, several motorists were found to have been driving illegally along it, and children had found it a useful shortcut to school. In early 1972, Viking Motors ran a return service from Burton-on-Trent to the interchange for 65p return.

The junction was opened on 24 May 1972 by the then Secretary of State for the Environment, Peter Walker. The opening was delayed by several months because of "box girder inspections". These followed the interim report of the Merrison Enquiry set up following the collapse of similar box girder bridges in Australia and Wales. Birmingham City Council saw the junction as a potential opportunity to attract visitors to the city, and proposed a Grand Prix involving the interchange.

The junction has undergone major repair work several times since, owing to the very heavy traffic through the junction and cost-saving measures during its construction. In November 2007, a sliproad running from the Tyburn Road onto the Aston Expressway was closed to undergo urgent repair works. Upon inspection, it was found that Spaghetti Junction itself was in need of repair work because salt and grit had weakened the joints in the structure. By 2009, it was estimated that 1¼ billion vehicles had travelled through the junction, and although structural defects had been found, the overall structure was stable enough to continue carrying traffic.

South-east of the junction, the M6 is on the elevated Bromford Viaduct – the longest viaduct in the UK.

Co-located junctions

Underneath the motorway junction are the meeting points of local roads, the river Tame's confluences with the River Rea and Hockley Brook, the Cross-City and Walsall railway lines and Salford Junction, where the Grand Union Canal, Birmingham and Fazeley Canal and Tame Valley Canal meet.

Cultural references
Gravelly Hill Interchange appears in the 1973 Cliff Richard musical film Take Me High, where he plays a banker living on a barge on Gas Street Basin. Ken Dodd called the junction "the eighth wonder of the world", because "you get on and wonder how to get off".

The National Lottery-based show Winning Lines featured a booby prize as a trip to Spaghetti Junction.

In 2022, for the 50th anniversary of the opening of Spaghetti Junction, Heinz released a limited edition of their tinned spaghetti featuring the interchange on the tin. 

The under side of Spaghetti Junction was used for the homeless camp/stacks in Steven Spielberg's 2018 film Ready Player One.

See also
Transport in Birmingham
List of road junctions in the United Kingdom
Other Spaghetti Junctions

References

External links 

 How the BBC described it.

1972 establishments in England
Erdington
Motorway junctions in England
Roads in the West Midlands (county)
Transport in Birmingham, West Midlands
Transport infrastructure completed in 1972
M6 motorway
Metaphors referring to spaghetti